The 2010 provincial elections of Sardinia took place on 30–31 May 2010. A run-off took place in Cagliari, Nuoro and Ogliastra on 12–13 June.

Six provinces were won by the centre-left, two by the centre-right, which gained Olbia-Tempio.

Results

Presidents

|- 
!align=left rowspan=2 valign=center bgcolor="#E9E9E9"|
!colspan="3" align="center" valign=top bgcolor="lightblue"|The People of Freedom and allies
!colspan="3" align="center" valign=top bgcolor="pink"|Democratic Party and allies
!colspan="3" align="center" valign=top bgcolor="lightgreen"|Independence Republic of Sardinia
!colspan="1" align="center" valign=top bgcolor="#E9E9E9"|Others
|-
|align="left" bgcolor="lightblue"|candidate
|align="center" bgcolor="lightblue"|1st round
|align="center" bgcolor="lightblue"|2nd round
|align="left" bgcolor="pink"|candidate
|align="center" bgcolor="pink"|1st round
|align="center" bgcolor="pink"|2nd round
|align="left" bgcolor="lightgreen"|candidate
|align="center" bgcolor="lightgreen"|1st round
|align="center" bgcolor="lightgreen"|2nd round
|align="center" bgcolor="#E9E9E9"|1st round
|-
|align="left" valign=top bgcolor="#E9E9E9" |Cagliari
|align="left" valign=top bgcolor="lightblue"|Giuseppe Farris(The People of Freedom)Piergiorgio Massidda(The People of Freedom)
|align="center" valign=top bgcolor="lightblue"|46.5%9.0%
|align="center" valign=top bgcolor="lightblue"|47.6%
|align="left" valign=top bgcolor="pink"|Graziano Milia(Democratic Party)Federico Palomba(Italy of Values)
|align="center" valign=top bgcolor="pink"|33.8%6.6%
|align="center" valign=top bgcolor="pink"|52.4%
|align="left" valign=top bgcolor="lightgreen"|Ornella Demuru(IRS)
|align="center" valign=top bgcolor="lightgreen"|2.7%
|align="center" valign=top bgcolor="lightgreen"|-
|align="center" valign=top bgcolor="#E9E9E9"|1.4%
|-
|align="left" valign=top bgcolor="#E9E9E9" |Carbonia-Iglesias
|align="left" valign=top bgcolor="lightblue"|Giuseppe Madeddu(The People of Freedom)
|align="center" valign=top bgcolor="lightblue"|45.2%
|align="center" valign=top bgcolor="lightblue"|-
|align="left" valign=top bgcolor="pink"|Salvatore Cherchi(Democratic Party)
|align="center" valign=top bgcolor="pink"|50.4%
|align="center" valign=top bgcolor="pink"|-
|align="left" valign=top bgcolor="lightgreen"|Giovannino Sedda(IRS)
|align="center" valign=top bgcolor="lightgreen"|2.9%
|align="center" valign=top bgcolor="lightgreen"|-
|align="center" valign=top bgcolor="#E9E9E9"|1.5%
|-
|align="left" valign=top bgcolor="#E9E9E9" |Medio Campidano
|align="left" valign=top bgcolor="lightblue"|Efisio Meloni(The People of Freedom)Onorato Serra(Fortza Paris)
|align="center" valign=top bgcolor="lightblue"|39.4%1.7%
|align="center" valign=top bgcolor="lightblue"|-
|align="left" valign=top bgcolor="pink"|Fulvio Tocco(Democratic Party)
|align="center" valign=top bgcolor="pink"|55.1%
|align="center" valign=top bgcolor="pink"|-
|align="left" valign=top bgcolor="lightgreen"|Gabriele Littera(IRS)
|align="center" valign=top bgcolor="lightgreen"|2.9%
|align="center" valign=top bgcolor="lightgreen"|-
|align="center" valign=top bgcolor="#E9E9E9"|2.6%
|-
|align="left" valign=top bgcolor="#E9E9E9" |Nuoro
|align="left" valign=top bgcolor="lightblue"|Luigi Crisponi(Sardinian Reformers)
|align="center" valign=top bgcolor="lightblue"|38.4%
|align="center" valign=top bgcolor="lightblue"|48.7%
|align="left" valign=top bgcolor="pink"|Roberto Deriu(Democratic Party)Efisio Arbau(Democratic Party)
|align="center" valign=top bgcolor="pink"|32.5%23.9%
|align="center" valign=top bgcolor="pink"|51.3%
|align="left" valign=top bgcolor="lightgreen"|Salvatore Bussa(IRS)
|align="center" valign=top bgcolor="lightgreen"|4.4%
|align="center" valign=top bgcolor="lightgreen"|-
|align="center" valign=top bgcolor="#E9E9E9"|0.8%
|-
|align="left" valign=top bgcolor="#E9E9E9" |Ogliastra
|align="left" valign=top bgcolor="lightblue"|Sandro Rubiu(The People of Freedom)Gianfranco Lecca(New PSI)Giorgio Ladu(Lega Nord Sardinia)
|align="center" valign=top bgcolor="lightblue"|43.8%8.9%3.0%
|align="center" valign=top bgcolor="lightblue"|49.0%
|align="left" valign=top bgcolor="pink"|Bruno Pilia(Democratic Party)
|align="center" valign=top bgcolor="pink"|41.1%
|align="center" valign=top bgcolor="pink"|51.0%
|align="left" valign=top bgcolor="lightgreen"|Nicola Cantalupo(IRS)
|align="center" valign=top bgcolor="lightgreen"|3.3%
|align="center" valign=top bgcolor="lightgreen"|-
|align="center" valign=top bgcolor="#E9E9E9"|0.0%
|-
|align="left" valign=top bgcolor="#E9E9E9" |Olbia-Tempio
|align="left" valign=top bgcolor="lightblue"|Fedele Sanciu(The People of Freedom)Vittorio Chirco(Lega Nord Sardinia)
|align="center" valign=top bgcolor="lightblue"|53.2%1.6%
|align="center" valign=top bgcolor="lightblue"|-
|align="left" valign=top bgcolor="pink"|Gesuino Achenza(Democratic Party)Anna Murrighile(Alliance for Italy)
|align="center" valign=top bgcolor="pink"|39.3%3.6%
|align="center" valign=top bgcolor="pink"|-
|align="left" valign=top bgcolor="lightgreen"|Gianmaria Bellu(IRS)
|align="center" valign=top bgcolor="lightgreen"|2.3%
|align="center" valign=top bgcolor="lightgreen"|-
|align="center" valign=top bgcolor="#E9E9E9"|0.0%
|-
|align="left" valign=top bgcolor="#E9E9E9" |Oristano
|align="left" valign=top bgcolor="lightblue"|Massimiliano De Seneen(The People of Freedom)
|align="center" valign=top bgcolor="lightblue"|59.7%
|align="center" valign=top bgcolor="lightblue"|-
|align="left" valign=top bgcolor="pink"|Gian Mario Tendas(Democratic Party)Ivano Cuccu(Christian Popular Union)
|align="center" valign=top bgcolor="pink"|29.7%3.1%
|align="center" valign=top bgcolor="pink"|-
|align="left" valign=top bgcolor="lightgreen"|Sebastian Madau(IRS)
|align="center" valign=top bgcolor="lightgreen"|5.9%
|align="center" valign=top bgcolor="lightgreen"|-
|align="center" valign=top bgcolor="#E9E9E9"|1.6%
|-
|align="left" valign=top bgcolor="#E9E9E9" |Sassari
|align="left" valign=top bgcolor="lightblue"|Mariano Mameli(The People of Freedom)Luigi Todini(Lega Nord Sardinia)
|align="center" valign=top bgcolor="lightblue"|41.1%0.8%
|align="center" valign=top bgcolor="lightblue"|-
|align="left" valign=top bgcolor="pink"|Alessandra Giudici(Democratic Party)
|align="center" valign=top bgcolor="pink"|50.7%
|align="center" valign=top bgcolor="pink"|
|align="left" valign=top bgcolor="lightgreen"|Gavino Sale(IRS)
|align="center" valign=top bgcolor="lightgreen"|6.5%
|align="center" valign=top bgcolor="lightgreen"|-
|align="center" valign=top bgcolor="#E9E9E9"|0.9%
|}Source: Ministry of the Interior

Parties
Source: Ministry of the Interior

Elections in Sardinia
Sardinia
2010 elections in Italy
May 2010 events in Italy
June 2010 events in Italy